Wuyi University (abbreviated as WYU) is a public university based in Jiangmen, Guangdong, China.

Wuyi University ranked 79th in the world for Nature Index 2021 Young Universities (Leading 150 Young Universities) and 147th in China for Nature Index 2022.

Academics

Faculties 
List of schools:
 School of Rail Transportation (轨道交通学院)
 School of Biotechnology and Health Sciences (生物科技与大健康学院)
 School of Economics & Management (经济管理学院)
 School of Textile Materials and Engineering (纺织材料与工程学院)
 School of Politics and Law (政法学院)
 School of Foreign Languages (外国语学院)
 School of General Education (通识教育学院)
 School of Aesthetic Education (美育教育中心)
 Faculty of Intelligent Manufacturing (智能制造学部)

List of departments:
 Chinese Language and Literature Department
 Department of Management Science and Engineering
 Department of Tele-communications and Electronics Engineering
 Department of Computer and Internet Network Engineering
 Department of Information and Control Engineering
 Mathematics and Physics Department
 Mechanics and Electricity Department
 Civil Engineering Department
 Social Science and Art Department
 Physical Education Department

Research centres 
List of research centres:
 Institute for Guangdong Qiaoxiang Studies (广东侨乡文化研究院)
 Research Center of Cyberspace Security and Big Data Technology (网络空间安全与大数据技术研究中心)
 International Healthcare Innovation Institute (Jiangmen) (江门市大健康国际创新研究院)
 Smart Materials Integration Research Lab (SMIR Lab) (智能材料集成研究实验室)
 Big Data and Data Intelligence Application Research Team (大数据与数据智能应用研究团队)

Accreditation and memberships 
Wuyi University is a member of SAP University Alliances.

Partner institutions 
Wuyi University has established partnerships with nearly 50 universities in 14 countries and regions including China, United States, United Kingdom, Germany, France, Canada, Australia, Hong Kong, Macau and South Korea.

Below are the partial list of WYU's institutions partners:

 Australia
University of Wollongong
Western Sydney University
 Canada
McGill University
University of British Columbia
 China
Tsinghua University
Peking University
Shanghai Jiao Tong University
Zhejiang University
Harbin Institute of Technology
Southern University of Science and Technology
Sun Yat-sen University
Shenzhen University
Shandong University
Lanzhou University
South China University of Technology
Jinan University
Guangdong University of Technology
Beijing Jiaotong University
Southwest Jiaotong University
Central South University
Donghua University
Southern Medical University
Dongguan University of Technology
 France
University of Lorraine
University of Rennes 1
 Hong Kong, China
Hong Kong University of Science and Technology
Hong Kong Polytechnic University
Lingnan University
 Germany
German Research Centre for Artificial Intelligence (DFKI)
Karlsruhe Institute of Technology
Anhalt University of Applied Sciences
 Macau, China
University of Macau
Macau University of Science and Technology
 South Korea
Korea Advanced Institute of Science and Technology
 United Kingdom
Durham University
Liverpool School of Tropical Medicine
 United States
University of Pennsylvania
Northwestern University
University of Florida
Rutgers University
University of Wisconsin–Madison
Arizona State University
Washington State University
University of Texas at Arlington
Marquette University
Howard University

Rankings and reputation

Nature Index 
Nature Index tracks the affiliations of high-quality scientific articles and presents research outputs by institution and country on monthly basis.

Academic Ranking of World Universities (ARWU) 
Academic Ranking of World Universities (ARWU), also known as the Shanghai Ranking, is one of the annual publications of world university rankings. It's the first global university ranking with multifarious indicators.

CUAA (Chinese Universities Alumni Association) 
Universities Ranking of China released by CUAA (Chinese Universities Alumni Association, Chinese: 中国校友会网) is one of the most foremost domestic university rankings in China.

Publications 
 Journal of Wuyi University.

References

External links
Wuyi University Official Website (English)
Wuyi University Official Website (Chinese)

Universities and colleges in Guangdong
Educational institutions established in 1985
1985 establishments in China
Jiangmen